"Are You Ready" is a song by Australian rock band AC/DC. It is featured on the band's 1990 album The Razors Edge. A live version of the song recorded on the tour of the same name appeared on one of AC/DC's two live albums of 1992, Live: 2 CD Collector's Edition. The song peaked at number one in New Zealand, becoming the band's only number-one hit there, and has been certified gold for sales exceeding 5,000. The song also peaked at number 16 on the US Billboard Album Rock Tracks chart, number six in Ireland, number 14 in Finland, and number 18 in Australia. Music & Media magazine called the song "the best example of a rhetorical question". "Are You Ready" was used as the official theme for WWE SmackDown on Fox.

Music video
The music video to this song, directed by David Mallet, shows prisoners attending an AC/DC mini-concert at their prison. One prisoner is being dressed up to get ready for the band to play the song. Guards shave his head nearly bald, leaving hairs that make up AC/DC's logo, the one similar to the cover of the band's music video tape, Clipped. The video was filmed at Bray Studios (UK), with those portraying the prisoners having responded to an open invitation broadcast by Tommy Vance during his Friday Rock Show on BBC Radio 1 a few days earlier. Respondents were instructed to make their way to Baker Street in London, where they were issued their 'uniforms' and transported by coach to Bray.

Track listings
7-inch and cassette single
 "Are You Ready"
 "Got You by the Balls"
 Two limited-edition 7-inch singles were also issued in the UK. One included an AC/DC patch while another was issued in a sleeve designed as a satchel.

Australian 12-inch and CD single
 "Are You Ready" – 4:10
 "Got You by the Balls" – 4:29
 "D.T." – 2:59
 "Chase the Ace" – 3:00

European 12-inch and CD single
 "Are You Ready" – 4:10
 "Got You by the Balls" – 4:29
 "The Razors Edge" – 4:22

Personnel
 Brian Johnson – lead vocals
 Angus Young – lead guitar
 Malcolm Young – rhythm guitar, background vocals
 Cliff Williams – bass guitar, background vocals
 Chris Slade – drums

Charts

Weekly charts

Year-end charts

Certifications

Release history

References

1990 songs
1991 singles
AC/DC songs
Albert Productions singles
Atco Records singles
Music videos directed by David Mallet (director)
Number-one singles in New Zealand
Song recordings produced by Bruce Fairbairn
Songs written by Angus Young
Songs written by Malcolm Young
WWE SmackDown